is a Japanese luger who has competed since 1992. Her best finish at the FIL World Luge Championships was 22nd in the women's singles event at Nagano in 2004.

References
 FIL-Luge profile

External links
 
 
 

1982 births
Living people
Japanese female lugers
Olympic lugers of Japan
Lugers at the 2010 Winter Olympics